The Missionary is a 1982 British comedy film directed by Richard Loncraine, and starring Michael Palin and Maggie Smith. It was produced by George Harrison, Denis O'Brien, Palin (who also wrote the screenplay) and Neville C. Thompson.

Plot
A Church of England priest, Reverend Charles Fortescue, works as a missionary in Africa and after ten years returns to England in the spring of 1906. As the ship docks, a fellow passenger, later identified as  Isabel Lady Ames, bumps into him by accident.

Charles is engaged to Deborah Fitzbanks, the daughter of a fellow clergyman. She was only a child when he left but is now a young woman eager to be married and have lots of children; however, she dislikes being touched by him.

The Bishop of London gives him a new assignment, to set up a mission to rescue the women of the evening who frequent the London Docklands, but cannot offer him any funding. To assist him, Deborah writes to Lord Ames, the richest man in England. Charles reluctantly calls at their enormous mansion. The place has so many rooms that Slatterthwaite, the longtime butler, constantly has trouble finding his way about. He does eventually manage to bring Charles to the Ameses. Lord Ames loathes missionaries (among other things), but Lady Ames is inclined to contribute, especially as she finds him attractive (and tells him so). Somewhat alarmed, Charles tries to leave, but she insists he spend the night.

Late that night, she comes to his room. He tries to get her to leave but when they hear someone coming she hides under his bed clothes. It turns out to be Slatterthwaite, lost once again. After he realises that this is not his room, he departs. Isabel then takes advantage of the situation to take advantage of Charles. Satisfied, she funds his mission.

Charles industriously sets to work, but the first prostitute he speaks to is highly sceptical. When he insists that he does not look down upon her, she challenges him to prove it by sleeping with her. Apparently he does, and as word quickly spreads of his unorthodox methods, his mission is soon filled with young women. When Isabel pays a visit, she discovers him exhausted and sleeping on the floor, with three naked women in his bed. She cuts off her contributions.

When Charles tries to explain himself, Isabel states that she was hoping he would help her to change her life (Lord Ames, it turns out, does not have anything physically to do with her), and now she threatens to do it herself. The women resume their trade to keep the mission going.

Fortescue is visited at the mission by the Bishop. Fortescue tries to explain that the mission has become so successful that they no longer need Lady Ames' money. The Bishop tells him that it's the mission's very success that is threatening its continuance. Other religious denominations in the area are complaining that they can't attract enough girls to their own missions, as they're all going to Fortescue. The Bishop tells him that, because of rumours, he must move to another parish, otherwise the Missionary Council will close the mission down.

The Bishop also tells him that someone has tried to murder Lord Ames by poisoning his food; the attempt failed only because Slatterthwaite took a wrong turning again and one of the gardeners died instead. From this, Charles deduces that Lady Ames intends to have her husband murdered. He races to their Scottish estate on the day of his wedding and manages to foil a shooting "accident" engineered by Corbett, an ardent admirer of Isabel. The bullet hits Lady Ames instead, though she is only wounded. Lord Ames takes butler Slatterthwaite as his new bed companion.

Meanwhile, the Bishop of London receives numerous complaints from other denominations about Charles's unusual methods. He gives Charles a choice: leave the mission or the Church. Charles chooses the latter, and is joined by Isabel. Photos at the end of the film show that they have two children together.

Cast

See also
 Rev. Harold Davidson, the "Prostitutes' Padre" whose attempts to rescue young girls from vice got him defrocked by the Church of England in 1932; he was later killed by a lion.

References

External links
 
 
 
 
 

1982 films
1982 independent films
1980s historical comedy films
Columbia Pictures films
British historical comedy films
British independent films
1980s English-language films
Films with screenplays by Michael Palin
Films about prostitution in the United Kingdom
Films directed by Richard Loncraine
Films set in 1906
Films set in Africa
Films set in London
HandMade Films films
Films set in country houses
Films shot in Kenya
Works about missionaries
1980s British films